Zhibek Zholy Street is a street in the center of Almaty, Kazakhstan; the pedestrian part of the street is known as Arbat.

Location
The Zhibek Zholy Street is located in Medeu and Zhetysu districts, between the streets of Gogol and Makatayev. It starts from the Central Park and crosses the streets and avenues of Baribayev, Dostyk, Kunayev, Furmanov, Abylai Khan, Nauryzbai batyr, and Seifullin. Zhibek Zholy street ends in the Masanchi Street. The complete length of the street is 4200 m. 

The road is a one-way route for a transport from Kaldayakov street to Kunayev Street.

Sights
Kyzyl-Tan, 63 Jibek Joly Street

References

Almaty
Streets in Almaty